Etten-Leur is a railway station located in Etten-Leur, Netherlands. The station was opened on 11 December 1854 and is located on the Roosendaal–Breda railway. The station is operated by Nederlandse Spoorwegen. The station was closed between 25 September 1940 and 30 May 1972.

Train service
The following services currently call at Etten-Leur:
2x per hour intercity services Zwolle - Arnhem - Nijmegen - 's-Hertogenbosch - Roosendaal

External links
NS website 
Dutch Public Transport journey planner 

Railway stations in North Brabant
Railway stations opened in 1854
Etten-Leur
1854 establishments in the Netherlands
Railway stations in the Netherlands opened in the 19th century